Aloor may refer to:

Aloor, Kundapura, a village in Kundapura taluka, Udupi district, Karnataka, India
Aloor, Pattambi, a town in Pattambi taluk, Palakkad district, Kerala, India

See also
 Alur (disambiguation)